Jeffrey Schuh (born May 22, 1958 in Crystal, Minnesota) is a former linebacker in the National Football League.

Schuh was drafted in the seventh round of the 1981 NFL Draft by the Cincinnati Bengals and spent five seasons with the team. He would split his final season between the Green Bay Packers and the Minnesota Vikings.

He played at the collegiate level at the University of Minnesota.

See also
List of Green Bay Packers players

References

People from Crystal, Minnesota
Cincinnati Bengals players
Green Bay Packers players
Minnesota Vikings players
American football linebackers
University of Minnesota alumni
Minnesota Golden Gophers football players
Living people
1958 births